Character creation (also character generation / character design) is the process of defining a game character or other character. Typically, a character's individual strengths and weaknesses are represented by a set of statistics. Games with a fictional setting may include traits such as race, class, or species. Games with a more contemporary or narrower setting may limit customization to physical and personality traits. This is usually used in role-playing games.

Role-playing games

Character creation is the first step taken by the players (as opposed to the gamemaster) in preparation for a game. The result of character creation is a direct characterization that is recorded on a character sheet. In its most comprehensive form, it includes not only a game-specific representation of the character's physical, mental, psychological, and social properties in terms of statistics but also often less formal descriptions of the character's physical appearance, personality, personal back-story ("background"), and possessions. Often during play, only a character's appearance is explicitly described, while other traits are characterized indirectly, with the exact statistics known to the character's player and the game master, but not necessarily to other players.

Character advancement refers to the improvement of a character's statistics later in the game. The player will modify existing statistics and add new ones, usually by spending experience points or when gaining a new experience level. Character advancement typically uses similar rules as character creation. In order to avoid unrealistic sudden changes in character concept, changes during character advancement are often more limited than during initial character creation. For example, in many games attributes are harder (if not impossible) to change during character advancement.

The term character development is, in some contexts, used interchangeably with character advancement (in a sense similar to professional development or Human Development), whereas elsewhere character development refers instead to the player's indirect characterization of the character through role-playing (in a sense similar to film developing).

Making decisions 
A character's initial attribute scores are typically either generated randomly or determined by distributing character points, though some systems use a combination of both. Some game systems also allow attribute scores to be increased later in the game similarly to skills, usually via a predetermined system.

Characters can also gain a number of skills. What types of skills the characters can learn and how easily they can be learned usually depends on if the character creation system is "class based" or "skill based".

The process of creating a character for a given game involves a number of decisions, such as: advantages and disadvantages that a character will have, what values are to be assigned, and what particular statistics those values are to be assigned to. For most decisions, there will be a rule outlining by whom and how a decision can be made. Most of these rules can be classified into one of the three groups described below. They differ in several aspects, the most prominent being ease of use, as well as game balance and diversity of the generated results.

Most decisions in character creation are made according to the following principles:

 Prescription: The decision is predetermined by the rules (often by a formula or a table that maps one or more predetermined statistics to a specific choice for another), or it is made by the game master prior to character creation. This method facilitates fast and easy decisions that are likely to be balanced according to the judgement of the game's author and the game master, but doesn't allow for variation if not combined with other options. In an extreme case, characters are completely created by the author of a scenario, but even then, players usually may choose their character from the selection provided. This technique is often used to save time for short games run on gaming conventions.
 Examples would be the skill bonuses a character gets from their attributes in many games (which are usually determined by a table or a simple formula) or the number of character points a player gets to use for character creation (in GURPS, for example, this is set by the game master).

 Random Choice: Random choices are usually made by rolling dice and either using the result directly or looking it up in a table, depending on the decision that is to be made. Usually, a random generation system allows the full (or at least a rather large) range of values to be generated for each statistic, leading to a great diversity among newly generated characters. Thus, it is possible for a character to start the game with all-maximum scores (or nearly so). On the other hand, players have very little control over the scores, and rolling low scores can be very frustrating for some players. This method is generally less concerned with game balance than with ease of use.
 For example, in some editions of Dungeons & Dragons the player rolls 4d6 and adds the highest three numbers to generate an ability score (attribute value) from 3 to 18. In the first editions of the Stormbringer role playing game, the character's race and class both are determined by rolling 1d100 and looking up the result in the appropriate table.

 Player's Choice: Another option is to let the player make decisions, normally within clearly defined restrictions. These restrictions often involve allowing players to distribute a number of character points among various statistics. In such a point distribution system, higher scores often cost more points per level than lower ones, and costs may vary between statistics even within a category. Usually, there is an upper and lower limit for each score. Additional constraints may apply, depending on the game system. Point distribution gives the players much control over the character creation process and tends to make characters highly customizable. If the system is designed well, characters are usually more balanced than randomly created ones. On the other hand, this method is almost always more complicated and time-consuming than random generation.
 Examples for systems that almost exclusively use point distribution to determine statistics are (in roughly chronological order) the Hero System (including its predecessor Champions), GURPS, the World of Darkness series, and the Amber Diceless Roleplaying Game with its unusual auction system. Some Dungeons & Dragons editions also have an optional point buy method for determining ability scores.

 Narrative Generation: As used for example in the Traveller and Harnmaster RPGs or some cRPGs such as Mount & Blade and Darklands, this technique models a character's life prior to becoming an active adventurer with the player choosing family origin and then making further decisions at specific life "checkpoints" - for example early education, young adulthood and one or more "tours of duty" in various careers. Each stage will apply certain modifiers and give the character the opportunity to develop skills, advantages and possibly possessions - or to suffer setbacks and disadvantages. In some cases, a player may run through repeated career cycles to sacrifice character youth for additional skills, experience and material advancement. Levels of randomization and player agency vary dependent on the specific system - in some it is entirely possible for a character to die during the creation process and the player to need to start again from scratch.

Determining numerical values 
Determining numerical values comprises several steps that are not always distinct:
(a) Obtain a set of values and (b) select the statistics to assign them to
Assign the values to the statistics
Possibly adjust statistics scores by “shifting around” (stat) levels.
Example: In Castle Falkenstein, abilities are the only type of statistic. Each player gets the same pre-defined set of scores (1a) and can freely choose (1b) which abilities he wants them to assign to (2). In addition, higher scores can be bought by balancing them with a number of low scores (3).

Obtaining and assigning values 
Games that don't use point distribution to determine all statistics values typically use different methods for different types of statistic: In general, there are comparatively few attributes, and each one explicitly is assigned a value. Conversely, there are generally a rather large number of skills, and each character learns only some of them while the others are left at their respective default values. Here are some examples:

 To determine attribute values in Basic Dungeons & Dragons, Marvel Super Heroes, or Stormbringer 3rd edition, for example, the player rolls once (1a) for each attribute (1b) and must use whatever result occurred on the dice for that statistic (2). If for different attributes a different number of dice is used (as is the case for non-humans in Palladium, for instance), this is the most feasible option.
 D&D 3.5, on the other hand, allows the player to first randomly generate a number of values (1a) and then assign (2) each attribute one of them (1b).
 For determining skill values, Stormbringer 3rd edition combines two methods: Some of them (1b) are predetermined (1a, 2) by the character's randomly chosen profession (and race). The player then selects a randomly determined number of additional skills (1b) and rolls dice (1a) to determine starting values for them (2).

Adjusting scores 
Some creation systems use a mix of point-distribution and random generation; most common among these are variant rules that allow, for instance, the alteration of the initially random stats by taking a reduction of one trait in order to increase another. Often, such adjustments are made at a penalty, applying a two-for-one cost, for instance.

Another form of adjustment are racial or occupational ("class") modifiers. In many games, certain statistics are slightly increased or decreased depending on the character's race and sometimes profession. In Dungeons & Dragons, for example, non-human races typically increase one ability score by two (on a scale of 3 to 18) while another is lowered by the same amount. In Stormbringer 3rd edition, nearly all nationalities (subraces) cause adjustments of some or all attribute scores by an amount that is usually randomly determined and has a range of up to two-thirds of an attribute's initial value. In point-distribution systems, these modifiers generally contribute to a race's "point cost", while in other systems, it is up to the race's designer to balance different races against each other (if this is desired).

Templates and classes 

To speed up and ease the character creation process, many games use character templates of some sort: Sample characters representing genre-typical archetypes that are either completely ready-made or at least define the essential stats necessary for a character to be able to work in a given occupation or fill some dramatic role. For instance, a thief will probably know how to move quietly, pick locks, disarm traps, and climb walls. The use of character templates enables inexperienced players to easily create suitable characters as they won't be overwhelmed with having to select skills and abilities, and it still speeds up character creation for even the most experienced players.

In some games, these templates are only an optional character creation aid that has no prescribed effect on the rest of the game: They can be flexibly modified according to the game's character creation rules or can be ignored altogether. This is generally the case in games that try to give the player as much control over the character creation process as possible. (Examples are Shadowrun or GURPS.)

Other games use such a mechanism as a mandatory tool to provide direction and limitations to the character creation process as well as character development. This is the character class concept introduced by Dungeons & Dragons that is now used in all d20 System games and has been adopted by many others, such as Palladium Books' Megaversal system.

With a character class, most skills and abilities are predetermined, or must be chosen from a comparably narrow subset of all available traits, leaving the player to select only a few extra skills. Some people find this too limiting, while others like the fact that each character necessarily has to be specialized to fill a specific role in the group of player characters.
In a class-based system, a fighter is often not allowed any magical abilities, while mages are typically poor fighters. When players are not required do adhere to a specific template, on the other hand, their characters might turn out very similar even if they started from different templates — a fighter with good spell casting abilities is not much different from a spell caster with good fighting abilities.  Thus, the freedom of a class-less system requires extra caution on the side of the players to create a diverse group of characters.

There are games that aim to get the best of both worlds by using some kind of hybrid. One approach is to let the templates (called careers in Classic Traveller as well as in Warhammer Fantasy Roleplay) still restrict the choices available for character creation or development, but apply them only for a limited timespan:

During character creation in Classic Traveller, each character pursues one of six possible careers (professions) that decides which tables can be used to roll on, thus giving direction to the otherwise largely random process. When the character is ready to be played, he has ended this career, so it doesn't have a direct influence on character development during play.

Warhammer Fantasy Roleplay has a much more elaborate career system. Characters advance by entering a series of "careers" that provide access to a set of new or improved skills, and bonuses to attributes (called "advances"). The menu of careers available to characters reflects the setting of the game world. Basic careers are those that might be filled by any individual with a modest amount of training or instruction. Advanced careers require greater preparation and training, and are often more appropriate for the lifestyle of an active adventurer. The career system gives both an idea of what a character might have been doing before embarking on a career as an adventurer (working as a baker, night watchman, rat catcher, or farmer), and how they changed and developed through their career (becoming a mercenary, explorer, ship's captain, etc.).

As another approach, some games (such as Cyberpunk 2020) use a hybrid skill-class system, in which each of the primary roles (classes) in the game has one skill that is absolutely unique to it and defines that role, but apart from that, characters are created and advance using a skill point system rather than a class-and-level system.

References

Additional sources
 Michael Alyn Pondsmith. Castle Falkenstein (R. Talsorian Games, 1994). 
 Cyberpunk 2020
 Dungeons & Dragons 3rd edition / d20 System
 Steve Jackson, Scott Haring, Sean Punch. GURPS Lite (Steve Jackson Games, 2004). Available online from http://www.sjgames.com/gurps/lite/.
 Steve Jackson, Sean Punch, David Pulver. GURPS Basic Set: Characters (Steve Jackson Games, 2004). 
 Marvel Super Heroes
 Bob Charette, Paul Hume, Tom Dowd. Shadowrun (FASA CORPORATION, 1989).
 Kevin Siembieda. The Palladium Role-playing Game (Palladium Books, 1983).  (The second edition is called Palladium Fantasy Role-playing Game.) See Megaversal system.
 Traveller, Book 1, Characters and Combat (Games Designers' Workshop 1977, second edition 1981). And Book 2, Starships (Games Designers' Workshop 1977, second edition 1981; the chapter titled "Experience").

External links 
 Building Better Characters column on RPGnet

Role-playing game terminology
Video game gameplay